One Day in My Life is an autobiographical novel written by Bobby Sands while serving a fourteen-year sentence at Long Kesh, for possession of a gun as a member of the Irish Republican Army.

The novel was originally written on "toilet paper with a biro refill... hidden inside Sands' own body" during the winter of 1979. and first published in 1983.  It recounts Sands' mental, physical, and political struggles over a single day while he was taking part in the blanket protest against the removal of prisoners' political status by the British Government. In the book, Sands uses the phrase "concentration camp" to describe the conditions. He also recounts being severely beaten, abused, and sexually harassed by the prison warders.

Footnotes

1983 Irish novels
Irish autobiographical novels
Irish political novels
Novels set in Northern Ireland
Memoirs of imprisonment
Mercier Press books
Prison writings